Lisk is a surname. Notable people with this surname include:

 Alphonso Lisk-Carew (1887–1969), Sierra Leonean photographer
 Dennis Lisk, (born 1977), also known as Denyo, German singer
 Kati Lisk, victim of Richard Evonitz
 Pierre Lisk (born 1971), Sierra Leonean sprinter
 Ricarda Lisk (born 1981), German triathlete

See also
 Long Island serial killer